Wannu may be,

Wannu language, Nigeria
Puxian Wannu, Jurchen warlord